Frédéric Gueguen (born December 2, 1970) is a former professional footballer who played as a goalkeeper.

External links
Frédéric Gueguen profile at chamoisfc79.fr

1970 births
Living people
Sportspeople from Brest, France
French footballers
Association football midfielders
Stade Brestois 29 players
Montluçon Football players
LB Châteauroux players
Chamois Niortais F.C. players
Grenoble Foot 38 players
FC Rouen players
Ligue 1 players
Ligue 2 players
Footballers from Brittany
Brittany international footballers